Emma Bull (born December 13, 1954) is an American science fiction and fantasy author. Her novels include the  Hugo- and Nebula-nominated Bone Dance and the urban fantasy War for the Oaks. She is also known for a series of anthologies set in Liavek, a shared universe that she created with her husband, Will Shetterly. As a singer, songwriter, and guitarist, she has been a member of the Minneapolis-based folk/rock bands Cats Laughing and The Flash Girls.

Early years
Emma Bull was born in Torrance, California. She attended Beloit College in Wisconsin, and graduated in 1976 with a degree in English Literature and Composition. After graduating, she worked for a while as a journalist and graphic designer.

Career 
Emma Bull's best-known novel is War for the Oaks, one of the pioneering works of urban fantasy.

Her 1991 post-apocalyptic science fiction novel Bone Dance was nominated for the Hugo, Nebula, and World Fantasy Awards. She was a member of the writing group The Scribblies, which included her husband, Will Shetterly, as well as Pamela Dean, Kara Dalkey, Nate Bucklin, Patricia Wrede and Steven Brust.

With Steven Brust, Bull wrote Freedom and Necessity (1997), an epistolary novel set during the 19th century Chartist movement of the United Kingdom of Great Britain and Ireland.

Shared universes 

Bull and Shetterly created the shared universe of Liavek, for which they have both written stories. There are five Liavek collections extant.

Bull has also participated in Terri Windling's Borderland shared universe, which is the setting of her 1994 novel Finder.

Music 
 In the late 1980s and early 1990s, Bull sang in the Minneapolis-based rock-folk band Cats Laughing. She also reunited with the band for two concerts in 2015, including a reunion show at the Minicon 50 science fiction convention. Bull appears on Cats Laughing's two studio albums, and on the live CD and reunion concert DVD Cats Laughing: A Long Time Gone (2016).

From the early 1990s to 2001, Bull also both sang and played guitar in the "goth-folk" duo The Flash Girls, with whom she recorded three albums.

Screenwriting 
Bull wrote a screenplay for War for the Oaks, which was made into an 11-minute mini-film designed to look like a film trailer. She made a cameo appearance as the Queen of the Seelie Court, and Will Shetterly directed.

She is Executive Producer and one of the writers for Shadow Unit, along with Shetterly, Elizabeth Bear, Sarah Monette, and Amanda Downum.

Personal life 
Bull and Shetterly live in Minneapolis, Minnesota.

Bibliography

Novels

War for the Oaks (1987)
Falcon (1989)
Bone Dance (1991; nominated for Hugo, Nebula, and World Fantasy Awards)
Finder (1994)
The Princess and the Lord of Night (1994)
Freedom and Necessity (1997, with Steven Brust)
Territory (July 2007)

Short works
"Rending Dark" (1984) in Sword and Sorceress, edited by Marion Zimmer Bradley
"Badu's Luck" (1985) in Liavek
"The Well-Made Plan" (1986) in Liavek: The Players of Luck
"Danceland Blood" (1986, with Will Shetterly) as "Danceland" in Bordertown, edited by Terri Windling
"Wonders of the Invisible World" (1988 essay) in October–November issue of New North Artscape
"A Bird That Whistles" (1989) in Hidden Turnings, edited by Diana Wynne Jones
"Why I Write Fantasy" (1990 essay) in Pulphouse 6
"Silver or Gold" (1992) in After the King:  Stories in Honor of J.R.R. Tolkien, edited by Martin H. Greenberg
"The Stepsister's Story" (1995) in The Armless Maiden, edited by Terri Windling
"Joshua Tree" (2002) in The Green Man:  Tales from the Mythic Forest, edited by Ellen Datlow and Terri Windling
"The Black Fox" (2003) in Firebirds, edited by Sharyn November
"De La Tierra" (2004) in The Faery Reel, edited by Ellen Datlow and Terri Windling
"What Used to Be Good Still Is" (2006) in Firebirds Rising, edited by Sharyn November

Collection
Double Feature (1994, collected works with Will Shetterly) from NESFA Press
"Visionary" (poem)
"Why I Write Fantasy" (essay)
"Rending Dark"
"Badu's Luck"
"The Well-Made Plan"
"A Bird That Whistles"
"Danceland Blood" (with Will Shetterly)
"Wonders of the Invisible World" (essay)

Anthology series

Liavek (1985, Ace Books, edited with Will Shetterly)
Liavek: The Players of Luck (1986, Ace Books, edited with Will Shetterly)
Liavek: Wizard's Row (1987, Ace Books, edited with Will Shetterly)
Liavek: Spells of Binding (1988, Ace Books, edited with Will Shetterly)
Liavek: Festival Week (1990, Ace Books, edited with Will Shetterly)

Discography

With Cats Laughing:

 Bootleg Issue (1988)
 Another Way to Travel (1990)
 A Long Time Gone (forthcoming CD and concert DVD, 2016)

With The Flash Girls

 The Return of Pansy Smith and Violet Jones (1993)
 Maurice and I (1994)
 Play Each Morning Wild Queen (2001)

Award nominations
Nominee, 1988 Mythopoeic Fantasy Award for War for the Oaks
Nominee, 1991 Philip K. Dick Award, Best Novel for Bone Dance
Nominee, 1992 World Fantasy Award, Best Novel for Bone Dance
Nominee, 1992 Hugo Award, Best Novel for Bone Dance
Nominee, 1992 Nebula Award, Best Novel for Bone Dance
Nominee, 1993 Nebula Award, Best Novella for "Silver or Gold"
Nominee, 2008 World Fantasy Award, Best Novel for Territory
Nominee, 2014 Cando Award, Best Novel for "Territory"

References

External links

 at WordPress

Fantastic Fiction bibliography
Bibliography on SciFan
The Unusual Suspects at Shockwave Silver
Reviews for Emma Bull's Fantasy Fiction

1954 births
Living people
American women bloggers
American bloggers
American fantasy writers
American science fiction writers
Beloit College alumni
Women science fiction and fantasy writers
20th-century American novelists
21st-century American novelists
20th-century American women writers
21st-century American women writers
Novelists from Minnesota
American women novelists
Songwriters from California
Guitarists from California
People from Torrance, California
Novelists from California
20th-century American guitarists
Cats Laughing members
20th-century American women guitarists